Imelda dela Cruz Quibranza-Dimaporo is a Filipina politician from the first district of Tubod, Lanao del Norte, Philippines. She currently serves as a Governor of Lanao del Norte following former representative Arsenio A. Quibranza. Dimaporo was first elected as a Governor in 1998 and was re-elected in 2016 and 2019.

Personal life
Dimaporo was born as Imelda Quibranza on January 15, 1959 in Tubod, Lanao del Norte to Arsenio Quibranza and Teofila dela Cruz.

She married Abdullah Dimaporo, and have five children together. She studied at the Philippine Women's University with a degree of Business Administration. She was the president of Lanao del Norte Ladies Circle from 1996 to 1998. She was also the chairman of League of Provinces of the Philippines of the same year. In 1998 she was elected as a governor and chairperson of Panguil Bay Development Council.

References

Living people
1959 births
Governors of Lanao del Norte
PDP–Laban politicians
Philippine Women's University alumni
Filipino Muslims